Kheyrabad-e Olya (also Romanized as Kheyrābād-e ‘Olyā; also known as Kheyrābād-e Vālī and Bar Āftāb) is a village in Teshkan Rural District, Chegeni District, Dowreh County, Lorestan Province, Iran. At the time of Iran's 2006 census, its population was 37, in 4 families.

References 

Towns and villages in Dowreh County